is the first remix album by Japanese entertainer Miho Nakayama. Released through King Records on October 21, 1988, the album includes three tracks that feature a medley of Nakayama's hit songs.

The album peaked at No. 2 on Oricon's albums chart and sold over 183,000 copies.

Track listing

Credits
 Master mix by Masahiko "Monchi" Tanaka
 Edited by Masaaki Tamura
 Management: Norio Hashimoto (M.I.D.)

Charts

References

External links
 
 
 

1988 remix albums
Miho Nakayama compilation albums
Japanese-language compilation albums
King Records (Japan) compilation albums